Shotgun Slade is an American western mystery television series starring Scott Brady that aired seventy-eight episodes in syndication from 1959 to 1961 Created by Frank Gruber, the stories were written by John Berardino, Charissa Hughes, and Martin Berkeley. The series was filmed in Hollywood by Revue Studios.

The pilot for Shotgun Slade aired earlier in 1959 on CBS's Schlitz Playhouse.

Overview

After several years of total saturation on the networks, many western series began to lose popularity with viewing audiences, Shotgun Slade had three characteristics that made it unique. The first was Slade's profession. Instead being a marshal, sheriff or wandering gunfighter, Slade was a private detective, hired by individuals to track down criminals, return stolen money, or perform other similar duties. This was obviously influenced by the growing popularity of television private eyes such as Peter Gunn, Richard Diamond, Private Detective, 77 Sunset Strip, and Hawaiian Eye.

Another quirk was Slade's weapon of choice. Instead of packing a six gun, Slade carried a combination shotgun that has an upper and lower barrel. The lower barrel fired a 12-gauge shotgun shell, while the top barrel fired a .32 caliber rifle bullet. The idea was that this weapon gave Slade the ability to fire at close and distant targets with the same amount of accuracy. Several western television shows were known for featuring distinctive weapons, such as those on shows like The Rifleman, The Life and Legend of Wyatt Earp, Bat Masterson, Wanted: Dead or Alive, Johnny Ringo, and The Rebel, but Slade's shotgun stood out even among the weapons of those other shows. Despite the quirks and idiosyncrasies of the series, Shotgun Slade lasted for only two seasons.

Guest stars

Chris Alcaide appeared in "Freight Line".
Roscoe Ates as Lou Nugget in the episode "The Fabulous Fiddle"
Lane Bradford in the episodes "Gunnar Yensen" (1959) and "A Noose for Hurley" (1961)
Terry Burnham as Linda in "The Ghost of Yucca Flats" (1960)
Francis X. Bushman as Eckhart in "Crossed Guns" (1960)
Andy Clyde as Omar James in "Omar the Sign Maker" (1959) and in "A Noose for Hurley" (1961)
Jeanne Cooper as Sally Claymore in "Sudden Death" and as Francie in "Turkey Shoot" (both 1960)
Walter Coy as Lou Canner in "The Deadfall" (January 1, 1960)
Ted de Corsia as Ben Douglas in "Lost Goal" (1960)
Frank Ferguson as Mike Oliver in "The Salted Mine" (1959) and as a Sheriff in "Charcoal Bullet" (1960), and "Valley of the Shadow" (1961) 
Dean Fredericks as Vance in "Killer's Brand" (1960)
Rodolfo Hoyos, Jr., in "A Grave at San Gallo" (1961)
Brad Johnson as Kirby in "Barbed Wire Keep Out" and in another episode "The Missing Dog" (1960)
Brett King in "Five Graves" (1961) 
Ernie Kovacs as "Hack" Hackberry in the episode "Salted Mine"
Bethel Leslie in two episodes, including the character Kate Heinie (1960)
Nan Leslie as Judy Travers in "Treasure Trap" (1959)
Nora Marlowe in "The Safe Crackers"  
Tyler McVey as Homer Carlson in episode "Dead Man's Tale" (1960)
Gregg Palmer as a marshal in "Freight Line" (1959) and "Donna Juanita" (1960)
Brad Weston as Wiley in "Mesa of Missing Men" (1959) and as Billy in "Killer's Brand" (1960)

Music themes

The third novelty of the series is that it featured a modern jazz score instead of the traditional Western-themed music that was the norm for western television shows and movies. Again, this seems an influence of the private eye genre's popularity because most private eye shows featured a jazz score.

Episodes

Season 1

Season 2

References

McNeil, Alex. Total Television  (1996). New York: Penguin Books 
Brooks, Tim and Marsh, Earle, The Complete Directory to Prime Time Network and Cable TV Shows (1999). New York: Ballantine Books

External links

First-run syndicated television programs in the United States
1959 American television series debuts
1961 American television series endings
1960s Western (genre) television series
1950s American mystery television series
1960s American mystery television series
Black-and-white American television shows
Television series by Universal Television
Television shows set in Colorado
Television shows filmed in Los Angeles
Western (genre) television series featuring gimmick weapons
1950s Western (genre) television series
American detective television series